Fred Lee Banks Jr. (born September 1, 1942) is an American lawyer, politician, and former Mississippi Supreme Court justice, having served on the court from 1991 to 2001.

Early life, education, and career
Banks grew up in Jackson, Mississippi, the son of F. L. Banks Sr. and Violet Mabery Banks and graduated from Lanier High School in 1960.

He received a BBA from Howard University in Washington, D.C. followed by a JD from the Howard University School of Law, in 1968, where he graduated cum laude, second in his class. Banks "chose to enter the law to help African Americans achieve equality", being one of only a handful of African American attorneys in the state at the time of his graduation. After gaining admission to the bar in Mississippi, he entered into private practice in Jackson with several other attorneys acting as local counsel for the NAACP Legal Defense and Education Fund. He then formed a law firm with several of those attorneys, Reuben Anderson, E.M. Nichols, and Melvyn R. Leventhal.

Career

Legislative service
In 1975, Banks was elected to represent Hinds County in the Mississippi House of Representatives. He was twice re-elected. During his time in the House, Banks chaired the House Ethics Committee, the House Judiciary Committee, and the Legislative Black Caucus. Banks, along with Representatives Horace L. Buckley and Douglas L. Anderson, also from Jackson, fought to preserve records from the pro-segregation Mississippi State Sovereignty Commission, in opposition to a bill which would authorize the destruction of these records. Also during this period, on September 24, 1979, President Jimmy Carter announced his appointment of Banks as one of nine members of the National Advisory Council on the Education of Disadvantaged Children.

Judicial service
During this time, Reuben Anderson had been appointed to a seat as a Circuit Judge for the 7th Circuit District, encompassing Hinds County and Yazoo. Banks served in the legislature until February 1985, when Governor William Allain, having elevated Reuben Anderson to the Mississippi Supreme Court, appointed Banks to Anderson's seat on the 7th Circuit District. Banks was twice re-elected without opposition. In January 1991, following Anderson's resignation from the Mississippi Supreme Court, Governor Ray Mabus appointed Banks to fill the remainder of Anderson's term. Banks was elected to serve the remainder of that term in November 1991 and re-elected to a full term in November 1996.

In 1993, Banks was mentioned as a potential nominee to the United States Court of Appeals for the Fifth Circuit, during the administration of President Bill Clinton, as there were no African American judges on the Fifth Circuit. Clinton ultimately appointed Louisiana state court judge Carl E. Stewart as the first African American judge on the Fifth Circuit.

Banks retired from the court in 2001, and thereafter became a senior partner at the law firm of Phelps Dunbar.

References

Justices of the Mississippi Supreme Court
Politicians from Jackson, Mississippi
Members of the Mississippi House of Representatives
Mississippi state court judges
Howard University alumni
Howard University School of Law alumni
American civil rights lawyers
1942 births
Living people